The 2018–19 Eredivisie was the 63rd season of the Eredivisie since its establishment in 1955. The season began on 10 August 2018 and concluded on 15 May 2019; the Europa League and relegation play-offs will take place later that month. PSV were the defending champions. Emmen, De Graafschap and Fortuna Sittard joined as the promoted clubs from the 2017–18 Eerste Divisie. They replaced Sparta Rotterdam, Twente and Roda JC who were relegated to the 2018–19 Eerste Divisie.

Teams 
A total of 18 teams took part in the league: The best fifteen teams from the 2017–18 season, two promotion/relegation playoff winners (FC Emmen and De Graafschap) and the 2017–18 Eerste Divisie runners-up (Fortuna Sittard). FC Emmen will play in the Eredivisie for the first time in their history.

Stadiums and locations

Personnel and kits 

Note: Flags indicate national team as has been defined under FIFA eligibility rules. Players and Managers may hold more than one non-FIFA nationality.

Managerial changes

Standings

Results

Season statistics

Top scorers 

Source: nos.nl

Hat-tricks

Assists 

Source: nos.nl

Discipline 
Player with the most yellow cards: 11
Tom Beugelsdijk (ADO Den Haag)

Players with the most red cards: 2
José Rodríguez (Fortuna Sittard)
Morten Thorsby (SC Heerenveen)
Urby Emanuelson (FC Utrecht)
Fabian Serrarens (De Graafschap)
Jesper Drost (Heracles Almelo)
Maikel van der Werff (Vitesse)
Mounir El Allouchi (NAC Breda)
Danilho Doekhi (Vitesse)

Updated to match(es) played on 8 April 2019.

Awards

Monthly awards

Annual awards

Play-offs

European competition 
Four teams will play for a spot in the 2019–20 UEFA Europa League second qualifying round.

Key: * = Play-off winners, (a) = Wins because of away goals rule, (e) = Wins after extra time in second leg, (p) = Wins after penalty shoot-out.

Promotion/relegation play-offs

References

External links 

 

2018–19
Neth
1